Colin Best (born 22 November 1978) is an Australian former professional rugby league footballer who played in the 1990s, 2000s and 2010s. Best also played in the Super League for English club, Hull FC.

Background
Before his rugby league career, Best had also represented Australia at a junior level in indoor soccer.

Career
Best made his first grade debut for Cronulla in round 12 1998 against North Sydney, scoring a try in a 16–12 victory at Shark Park.  In 1999, Best made 14 appearances and scored 12 tries as Cronulla won the minor premiership but lost in the preliminary final against rivals St. George at Stadium Australia.

The following year, Best scored 13 tries from 26 games as Cronulla reached the finals but were eliminated by the Brisbane Broncos in the first week.  In 2001, Best played in Cronulla's preliminary final defeat against eventual premiers Newcastle.

At the end of 2002, Best signed with Hull in the Super League and spent two years in England before returning to Australia and signing with St. George.  In the 2005 NRL season, Best finished as the club's top try scorer with 20 tries.  Best played in the club's preliminary final loss against eventual premiers Wests Tigers at the Sydney Football Stadium.

In 2006, Best scored 6 tries in 19 games as St. George reached another preliminary final, however Best missed the match through injury.  In 2007, Best signed for Canberra.

In 2008, while playing for Canberra he was awarded the Dally M Winger of the Year Award.

During the 2008 NRL season, Best signed a two-year contract with South Sydney commencing in the 2009.  Best scored a try on debut for South Sydney's round 1 victory over rivals the Sydney Roosters which finished 52–12.

In the 2009 State of Origin series Best was named in the 40 man New South Wales preliminary squad but ultimately was not selected for any of the games.

He signed for the Cronulla-Sutherland Sharks for two seasons starting in 2011. At the end of the two seasons, Best announced his retirement, after a 15-year career, playing his final game in a finals lost against former club Canberra. Following his retirement, he was one of seventeen Cronulla players found guilty of using illegal substances under the club's 2011 supplements program, having a twelve-month suspension (which had already expired due to backdating) recorded against his name.

Career highlights

Junior Club: Engadine Dragons
First Grade Debut: Round 12, Cronulla v North Sydney, Toyota Park, 30 May 1998
First Grade Record: 170 appearances scoring 87 tries

References

External links

Canberra Raiders profile
Colin Best NRL.com
 (archived by web.archive.org) Stats → PastPlayers → B at hullfc.com
 (archived by web.archive.org) Statistics at hullfc.com

1978 births
Australian rugby league players
Cronulla-Sutherland Sharks players
Hull F.C. players
St. George Illawarra Dragons players
Canberra Raiders players
South Sydney Rabbitohs players
New South Wales City Origin rugby league team players
Rugby league centres
Rugby league wingers
Rugby league players from Sydney
Living people